The   Assistant Chief of the Naval Staff (ACNS) are several important senior military appointments in the Pakistan Navy and are the second in command (S-in-C) of their respective branch and these appointments are held by senior officers of Commodore rank and are reporting and functioning directly under their respective Deputy Chief of the Naval Staff (DCNS) who are the branch and principle staff commanders.

Second in Principle Staff Commands
ACNS Operations
ACNS Supply
ACNS Projects
ACNS Projects II
ACNS Materials
ACNS Administration
ACNS Training and Personnel
ACNS Welfare and Housing
ACNS Education
ACNS Budgets
ACNS Works
ACNS Plans
ACNS Technical

See also
Deputy Chief of the Naval Staff

Pakistan Navy